The 1975 Southern Conference men's basketball tournament took place from March 1–6, 1975. The quarterfinal round was hosted at campus sites, while the semifinals and finals were hosted at the Greenville Memorial Auditorium in Greenville, South Carolina. The Furman Paladins, led by head coach Joe Williams, won their fourth Southern Conference title and received the automatic berth to the 1975 NCAA tournament.

Format
All of the conference's eight members were eligible for the tournament. Teams were seeded based on conference winning percentage. The tournament used a preset bracket consisting of three rounds.

Bracket

* Overtime game

See also
List of Southern Conference men's basketball champions

References

Tournament
Southern Conference men's basketball tournament
Southern Conference men's basketball tournament
Southern Conference men's basketball tournament